Marcella Jeanette "Marcy" Place (born April 23, 1959) is a former field hockey player from the United States, who was a member of the national team that won the bronze medal at the 1984 Summer Olympics in Los Angeles, California.

Four years later, when Seoul hosted the Summer Games, she finished in eighth position with Team USA. She was affiliated with the University of California in Berkeley.

References

External links
 

1959 births
Living people
American female field hockey players
California Golden Bears field hockey players
Field hockey players at the 1984 Summer Olympics
Field hockey players at the 1988 Summer Olympics
Medalists at the 1984 Summer Olympics
Olympic bronze medalists for the United States in field hockey
Sportspeople from Long Beach, California